Celina Jesionowska (later names Gerwin and Orzechowska, born 3 November 1933 in Łomża) is a Polish athlete who competed mainly in the 100 and 200 metres and, during the last part of her career, in the 400 metres. She competed for Poland in the 1960 Summer Olympics held in Rome, Italy, in the 4 x 100 metres where she won the bronze medal with her team mates Teresa Wieczorek, Barbara Janiszewska and Halina Richter.

Jesionowska also competed in three European Championships:

 1954 in Bern, where she was eliminated in the 100 metres semi-finals, and took fifth place in the 4 x 100 metres relay with her team mates Marią Ilwicką, Barbarą Lerczak and Marią Kusion.
 1958 in Stockholm, where she won the bronze medal in the 4 x 100 metres relay with the same team, and reached the semi-finals in the 200 and 100 metres. 
 1966 in Budapest, where she was eliminated in the first round qualifiers for the 100 metres.

Throughout her career, Jesionowska was a competitor with the Central Military Sports Club "Legia" Warsaw (CWKS "Legia" Warsaw), through which she attained seven Polish championships: 
 400 metres - 1964, 1965 and 1966.
 4 × 100 metres relay - 1957, 1958, 1959 and 1960.

Cultural influence
In 1976, Jesionowska appeared in an episode of the TV series The Way It Was which showcased the 1960 Summer Olympics, in which she gained her bronze medal.

Personal bests
Jesionowska's published personal bests include: 
 100 metres - 11.8 seconds
 200 metres - 23.8 seconds
 400 metres - 55.4 seconds
 80 meters hurdles - 11.0 seconds
 Long jump - 5.85 metres

References

1933 births
Polish female sprinters
Olympic bronze medalists for Poland
Athletes (track and field) at the 1960 Summer Olympics
Olympic athletes of Poland
Living people
People from Łomża
European Athletics Championships medalists
People from Białystok Voivodeship (1919–1939)
Sportspeople from Podlaskie Voivodeship
Medalists at the 1960 Summer Olympics
Olympic bronze medalists in athletics (track and field)
Legia Warsaw athletes
20th-century Polish women
Olympic female sprinters